Auchenflower railway station is located on the Main line in Queensland, Australia. It serves the Brisbane suburb of Auchenflower, adjacent to the Wesley Hospital.

History
Auchenflower station opened in 1887. The station was rebuilt in 1960 as part of the quadruplication of the line.

Services
Auchenlower is served by City network services operating from Nambour, Caboolture, Kippa-Ring and Bowen Hills to Springfield Central, Ipswich and Rosewood.

Services by platform

*Note: One weekday morning service (4:56am from Central) and selected afternoon peak services continue through to Rosewood.  At all other times, a change of train is required at Ipswich.

References

External links

Auchenflower station Queensland Rail
Auchenflower station Queensland's Railways on the Internet

Auchenflower, Queensland
Railway stations in Brisbane
Railway stations in Australia opened in 1887
Main Line railway, Queensland